Lisbon is an unincorporated community and census-designated place (CDP) in Lake County, Florida, United States. The population was 260 at the 2000 census. It is part of the Orlando–Kissimmee Metropolitan Statistical Area.

Geography
Lisbon is located in central Lake County at  (28.885413, -81.787225), in an area between Lake Yale to the northeast, Lake Eustis to the southeast, and Lake Griffin to the southwest.

Lisbon has low rolling landscape with elevations ranging from 30ft to 60ft.

Climate

Demographics

As of the census of 2000, there were 273 people, 107 households, and 81 families residing in the CDP. The racial makeup of the CDP was 92.31% White, 0.73% Native American, 6.96% from other races. Hispanic or Latino of any race were 9.89% of the population.

There were 107 households, out of which 23.4% had children under the age of 18 living with them, 59.8% were married couples living together, 7.5% had a female householder with no husband present, and 23.4% were non-families. 19.6% of all households were made up of individuals, and 9.3% had someone living alone who was 65 years of age or older.  The average household size was 2.55 and the average family size was 2.84.

In the CDP, the population was spread out, with 21.2% under the age of 18, 6.2% from 18 to 24, 28.2% from 25 to 44, 24.5% from 45 to 64, and 19.8% who were 65 years of age or older.  The median age was 40 years. For every 100 females, there were 111.6 males.  For every 100 females age 18 and over, there were 104.8 males.

The median income for a household in the CDP was $22,875, and the median income for a family was $33,984. Males had a median income of $33,281 versus $21,750 for females. The per capita income for the CDP was $13,635.  None of the families and 7.5% of the population were living below the poverty line.

References

Census-designated places in Lake County, Florida
Greater Orlando
Census-designated places in Florida